$30,000 is a 1920 American silent mystery film directed by Ernest C. Warde and starring J. Warren Kerrigan,  Fritzi Brunette and Carl Stockdale.

Synopsis
A struggling attorney is given $30,000 by a young female client who wishes him to use it to purchase a necklace which her brother has stolen and she wants to recover before he gets into trouble.

Cast
 J. Warren Kerrigan as John Trask
 Fritzi Brunette as 	Aline Norton
 Carl Stockdale as 	Ferdinand Spargo
 Nancy Chase as 	Christine Lloyd
 Joseph J. Dowling as Annester Norton 
 Arthur Millett as 'Shadow' Dan
 Frank L. Gereghty as 	Charley Foster 
 Jack Rollens as Sydney Lloyd
 Tom Guise as Mat Lloyd 
 Gertrude Valentine as Mrs. Hutchinson

References

Bibliography
 Connelly, Robert B. The Silents: Silent Feature Films, 1910-36, Volume 40, Issue 2. December Press, 1998.
Wlaschin, Ken. Silent Mystery and Detective Movies: A Comprehensive Filmography. McFarland, 2009.

External links
 

1920s American films
1920 films
1920s mystery films
1920s English-language films
American silent feature films
American mystery films
American black-and-white films
Films directed by Ernest C. Warde
Pathé Exchange films
Films distributed by W. W. Hodkinson Corporation
Silent mystery films